Harold Boardman (12 June 1907 – 1 August 1994) was a British Labour Party politician.

Born in Bolton, Boardman moved to Derby in his youth.  He worked as an official of the Union of Shop, Distributive and Allied Workers and was a member of Derby Town Council for 25 years. He was chairman of the Derby Co-operative Movement and of Derby Labour College.

Boardman was Member of Parliament for Leigh from 1945 to 1979, preceding Lawrence Cunliffe.

References

 Times Guide to the House of Commons October 1974
 Who's Who 1996

External links 
 

1907 births
1994 deaths
Labour Party (UK) MPs for English constituencies
National Union of Distributive and Allied Workers-sponsored MPs
UK MPs 1945–1950
UK MPs 1950–1951
UK MPs 1951–1955
UK MPs 1955–1959
UK MPs 1959–1964
UK MPs 1964–1966
UK MPs 1966–1970
UK MPs 1970–1974
UK MPs 1974
UK MPs 1974–1979
Councillors in Derbyshire
Members of the Parliament of the United Kingdom for Leigh